Rügen was a Kreis (district) in the northeastern part of Mecklenburg-Western Pomerania, Germany.

The district was bordered entirely by the Baltic Sea.  The nearest districts were Nordvorpommern and the district-free city Stralsund. The district covered the islands Rügen and Hiddensee, and several small islands like Ummanz and Vilm. It was thus the only district of Germany which consists solely of islands.

History
The district of Rügen was established in 1806 by the Swedish administration of Swedish Pomerania. At first it was named Amt Bergen, in 1810 it was renamed to Kreis Bergen. On 4 September 2011, Rügen was merged to Vorpommern-Rügen.

Coat of arms

Towns and municipalities
The subdivisions of the district were (situation August 2011):

References

External links

 Official website (German)
 Tourism website (German, English)

Former districts of Mecklenburg-Western Pomerania
Districts of Prussia
2011 disestablishments in Germany
States and territories disestablished in 2011